Zemacies ordinaria is an extinct species of sea snail, a marine gastropod mollusk in the family Borsoniidae.

Description

Distribution
This extinct marine species is endemic to New Zealand and was found in Lower Pliocene strata of the Chatham Islands.

References

 Marwick, Trans. N. Z. Inst., vol. 58, p. 489, 506, fig. 141. 
 Maxwell, P.A. (2009). Cenozoic Mollusca. pp. 232–254 in Gordon, D.P. (ed.) New Zealand inventory of biodiversity. Volume one. Kingdom Animalia: Radiata, Lophotrochozoa, Deuterostomia. Canterbury University Press, Christchurch.

ordinaria
Gastropods of New Zealand
Gastropods described in 1928